Sichuan Airlines serves the following destinations (as of February 2017).

List

References

Lists of airline destinations